These watercourses (rivers, creeks, sloughs, etc.) in the San Francisco Bay Area are grouped according to the bodies of water they flow into.  Tributaries are listed under the watercourses they feed, sorted by the elevation of the confluence so that tributaries entering nearest the sea appear first.  Numbers in parentheses are Geographic Names Information System feature identifiers.

Pacific Coast north of the Golden Gate

Sonoma Coast
Watercourses which feed into the Pacific Ocean in Sonoma County north of Bodega Head, listed from north to south:

The Gualala River and its tributaries
Gualala River (253221) 
North Fork (229679) – flows from Mendocino County. 
South Fork (235010) 
Big Pepperwood Creek (219227) – flows from Mendocino County. 
Rockpile Creek (231751) – flows from Mendocino County. 
Buckeye Creek (220029) 
Little Creek (227239) 
North Fork Buckeye Creek (229647) 
Osser Creek (230143) 
Roy Creek (231987) 
Soda Springs Creek (234853) 
Wheatfield Fork (237594) 
Fuller Creek (223983) 
Sullivan Creek (235693) 
Boyd Creek (219738) 
North Fork Fuller Creek (229676) 
South Fork Fuller Creek (235005) 
Haupt Creek (225023) 
Tobacco Creek (236406) 
Elk Creek (223108) 
House Creek (225688) 
Soda Spring Creek (234845) 
Allen Creek (218142) 
Pepperwood Creek (230514) 
Danfield Creek (222007) 
Cow Creek (221691) 
Jim Creek (226237) 
Grasshopper Creek (224470) 
Britain Creek (219851) 
Cedar Creek (220760) 
Wolf Creek (238086) 
Tombs Creek (236448) 
Marshall Creek (228139) 
McKenzie Creek (228391)

Northern Sonoma Coast
Watercourses which feed into the Pacific Ocean in Sonoma County between the Gualala and Russian Rivers, numbered from north to south:
Deadman Gulch (222120) 
Cannon Gulch (220545) 
Chinese Gulch (221069) 
Phillips Gulch (230598) 
Miller Creek (228727) 
Warren Creek (237257) 
Wildcat Creek (237784) 
Stockhoff Creek (235498) 
Timber Cove Creek (236355) 
Kolmer Gulch (226673) 
Fort Ross Creek (223705) 
Russian Gulch Creek (1723332) 
East Branch Russian Gulch (222861)
Middle Branch Russian Gulch (228574)
West Branch Russian Gulch (237436)

The Russian River and its tributaries
Russian River (267200) – flows from Mendocino County. 
Willow Creek (237879) 
Sheephouse Creek (232916) 
Orrs Creek (230114) 
Freezeout Creek (223863) 
Austin Creek (218466)
Kohute Gulch (226672) 
Kidd Creek (226569)
East Austin Creek (222846) 
Black Rock Creek (219403) 
Gilliam Creek (224171) 
Schoolhouse Creek (232673) 
Thompson Creek (236259) 
Gray Creek (224517) 
Lawhead Creek (234146) 
Devil Creek (222279) 
Conshea Creek (221468) 
Tiny Creek (236385) 
Sulphur Creek (235703) 
Ward Creek (237225) 
Big Oat Creek (219223) 
Blue Jay Creek (219496) 
Pole Mountain Creek (230900) 
Bearpen Creek (218919) 
Red Slide Creek (231390) 
Dutch Bill Creek (222756) 
Lancel Creek (226842) 
North Fork Lancel Creek (229689) 
Smith Creek (233315) 
Hulbert Creek (253871) 
Mission Creek (246001) 
Livereau Creek (227433)
Fife Creek (223491) 
Redwood Creek (231420) 
Pocket Canyon (230836)
Mays Canyon (228268)
Hobson Creek (225380)
Green Valley Creek (224576) 
Atascadero Creek (218443) 
Purrington Creek (231100) 
Mark West Creek (228118) 
Windsor Creek (238013) 
Pool Creek (230927) 
Laguna de Santa Rosa (226766) 
Santa Rosa Flood Control Channel (232565)
Abramson Creek
Piner Creek 
Paulin Creek
Santa Rosa Creek (232563) 
Matanzas Creek (228216) 
Spring Creek (235241) 
South Fork Matanzas Creek (235025) 
Brush Creek (231600) 
Salt Creek (232297) 
Blucher Creek (219480) 
Five Creek (223565)
Hinebaugh Creek (225359) 
Crane Creek (221795) 
Washoe Creek (237318) 
Gossage Creek (224355) 
Copeland Creek (221533) 
Porter Creek (230952) 
Humbug Creek (225753) 
Van Buren Creek (236996) 
Porter Creek (230951)
Press Creek (231039) 
Dry Creek (222623) – flows from Mendocino County. 
West Slough
Foss Creek (1657225) 
Norton Slough (1657226) 
Mill Creek (228686) 
Felta Creek (223436) 
Wallace Creek (237193)
Palmer Creek (230265) 
Pine Ridge Canyon (230719)
Kelley Creek (226456) 
Crane Creek (221794) 
Grape Creek (224441) 
Wine Creek (238037) 
Peña Creek (230478) 
Chapman Branch (220914) 
Boyer Creek (219744) 
Pechaco Creek (230457) 
Redwood Log Creek (231443) 
Dutcher Creek (222780) 
Fall Creek (223368) 
Schoolhouse Creek (232676) 
Warm Springs Creek (237246) 
Little Warm Springs Creek (227406) 
Picnic Creek (230623) 
Seven Oaks Creek (232821) 
Bear Creek (218806) 
Rancheria Creek (231215) 
Little Rancheria Creek (234172) 
Strawberry Creek (235583) 
Little Strawberry Creek (227381) 
Willow Springs Creek (237952) 
Wild Cattle Creek (237748) 
Bearpen Creek (218918) 
Fall Creek (223365) 
Brush Creek (219923) 
Yorty Creek (238273) 
Smith Creek (233325) 
Cherry Creek (233660) 
Galloway Creek (224021) – flows from Mendocino County. 
Rail Creek (231170) 
Maacama Creek (227883) 
Franz Creek (223840) 
Bidwell Creek (219108) 
Redwood Creek (231421)
Foote Creek (223653) 
Kellogg Creek (226462) 
Yellowjacket Creek (238248) 
Briggs Creek (219834) 
Little Briggs Creek (227202) 
Coon Creek (221498) 
McDonnell Creek (228350) 
Sausal Creek (232603) 
George Young Creek (224117) 
Burns Creek (220208) 
Grapevine Creek (224446) 
Gird Creek (224187) 
Miller Creek (228731) 
Gill Creek (224167) 
Crocker Creek (221835)
Barrelli Creek (218695) 
Porterfield Creek (230956) 
Cloverdale Creek (221256)
Big Sulphur Creek (254619) 
Little Sulphur Creek (227384) 
North Branch (229605) 
Lovers Gulch Creek (227735) 
Anna Belcher Creek (218287) 
Frasier Creek (223845) – flows from Mendocino County. 
Squaw Creek (235310) 
Alder Creek (218097) – flows from Mendocino County. 
Hummingbird Creek (225758) – flows from Mendocino County. 
Ash Creek (218427) – flows from Mendocino County.

Central Sonoma Coast
Watercourses which feed into the Pacific Ocean in Sonoma County between Goat Rock Beach and Bodega Head, numbered from north to south:
Scotty Creek (232742) 
Rough Creek (231923) 
Salmon Creek (232281) 
Finley Creek (223507) 
Coleman Valley Creek (221373) 
Fay Creek (223419) 
Tannery Creek (236018) 
Nolan Creek (229570) 
Thurston Creek (236333)

Bodega Bay
Watercourses which feed into Bodega Bay, numbered clockwise from Bodega Head to Sand Point:
Cheney Gulch (220937)
Shorttail Gulch (233054)
Estero Americano (223257)
Ebabias Creek (253711) 
Americano Creek (254563) 
Estero de San Antonio (253212)
Stemple Creek (253932)

Marin Coast
Watercourses which feed into the Pacific Ocean in Marin County south of Sand Point, listed from north to south:

Tomales Bay
Watercourses which feed into Tomales Bay, numbered clockwise from Sand Point to Tomales Point:
Walker Creek (255208)
Keys Creek (254852) 
Chileno Creek (254740) 
Frink Canyon (223952)
Verde Canyon (237053)
Salmon Creek (232280) 
Arroyo Sausal (254577) 
Millerton Gulch (228754)
Grand Canyon (224386)
Tomasini Canyon (236446)
Lagunitas Creek (255208)
Olema Creek (234410) 
Nicasio Creek (229534) 
Halleck Creek (224814) 
Redwood Canyon (231415) 
San Geronimo Creek (232400) 
Big Carson Creek (219156) 
Cataract Creek (220721) 
East Fork Lagunitas Creek (222888) 
White Gulch (237641)

Point Reyes Peninsula
Watercourses which feed into the Pacific Ocean between Tomales Point and Bolinas, numbered north to south:

Home Ranch Creek (225499) 
Glennbrook Creek
Santa Maria Creek
Coast Creek (233695) 
Alamere Creek (233404) 
Arroyo Hondo

Bolinas Lagoon
Watercourses which feed into Bolinas Lagoon, numbered clockwise from Bolinas to Stinson Beach:
Pine Gulch Creek (234476)
Copper Mine Gulch (221541)
Wilkins Gulch (237829)
Pike County Gulch (230651)
Audubon Canyon (218457)
Volunteer Canyon (1808968)
Morses Gulch (229094)
McKinnan Gulch (228412)
Stinson Gulch (235491)

Southern Marin Coast
Watercourses which feed into the Pacific Ocean between Stinson Beach and the Golden Gate, numbered north to south:
Webb Creek (237375) 
Lone Tree Creek (227525) 
Cold Stream (221345) 
Redwood Creek (231428) 
Fern Creek (223455) 
Tennessee Valley (255127)

San Francisco Bay and its tributaries

Northern San Francisco Bay
Watercourses which feed into San Francisco Bay and its tributary bays between the Golden Gate and Point San Pedro, numbered south to north:

Coyote Creek (221733) 
Arroyo Corte Madera del Presidio (254575) 
Old Mill Creek (229976) 
Cascade Creek (220661) 
San Clemente Creek (217925) 
Corte Madera Creek (Marin County, California) (258743) 
Tamalpais Creek (235983) 
Ross Creek (231905) 
San Anselmo Creek (232364) 
Sleepy Hollow Creek (249570) 
Fairfax Creek (223329) 
Carey Camp Creek (220595) 
Cascade Creek (220663) 
San Rafael Creek (232467)

Northern San Pablo Bay and Carquinez Strait
Watercourses which feed into San Pablo Bay or the Carquinez Strait between Point San Pedro and the Benicia-Martinez Bridge, numbered west to east:
Gallinas Creek (224018)
South Fork Gallinas Creek (235006) 
Miller Creek (228730) 
Novato Creek (229802) 
Arroyo San Jose (218406) 
Bowman Canyon (219721)
Petaluma River (253749) 
Black John Slough (219372) 
Rush Creek (232023)
Basalt Creek (218716)
Tule Slough (236607)
San Antonio Creek (253817)
Schultz Slough (232702) 
Adobe Creek (217990) 
Washington Creek
East Washington Creek
Lynch Creek (234217) 
Capri Creek
Lichau Creek (234157) 
Willow Brook (269133) 
Tolay Creek (236414) 
Sonoma Creek (234882) 
Napa Slough (229414)
East Branch (222851)
Second Napa Slough (232776)
Third Napa Slough (236244)
Railroad Slough (231180)
Steamboat Slough (235419)
Schell Slough (232647) 
Schell Creek (232645) 
Arroyo Seco Creek (218408) 
Nathanson Creek (229419) 
Haraszthy Creek (224911) 
China Slough (221058)
Fowler Creek (223770) 
Rodgers Creek (231809) 
Champlin Creek (220901) 
Felder Creek (223431) 
Lewis Creek (262425) 
Carriger Creek (220639) 
Agua Caliente Creek (218327) 
Hooker Creek (225537) 
Wilson Creek (237965) 
Butler Canyon (220277)
Whitman Canyon (237706)
Calabazas Creek (254687) 
Stuart Creek (235613) 
Graham Creek (224379) 
Yulupa Creek (238301) 
Bear Creek (218803) 
Napa River (255110) 
Napa Slough (229414)
Devils Slough (222329)
Huichica Creek (225741) 
White Slough (237683) 
Rindler Creek (231615) 
Blue Rock Springs Creek (219520) 
American Canyon Creek (218229) 
Carneros Creek (220626) 
Suscol Creek (235838) 
Tulucay Creek (255164) 
Kreuse Creek (226687) 
Murphy Creek (229347) 
Milliken Creek (234307) 
Sarco Creek (232579) 
Napa Creek (229413) 
Redwood Creek (231429) 
Soda Creek (234828) 
Dry Creek (233800) 
Conn Creek (233707) 
Rector Creek (234547) 
Sage Creek (234602) 
Clear Creek (233687) 
Chiles Creek (233665) 
Moore Creek (229017) 
Bale Slough (218624) 
Sulphur Creek (235712) 
York Creek (238269) 
Mill Creek (228685) 
Ritchey Creek (252565) 
Nash Creek (229417) 
Southampton Creek

Lake Berryessa
Watercourses which feed into Lake Berryessa, numbered clockwise from Monticello Dam:
Wragg Creek (238192)
Capell Creek (220581)
Smittle Creek (234731)
Trout Creek (236563)
Pope Creek (234501)
Maxwell Creek (228249) 
Hardin Creek (261085)
Burton Creek (220252) 
Stone Corral Creek (253935)
Butts Creek (233590) – flows from Lake County.
Routan Creek (234593) – flows from Lake County. 
Snell Creek (234752) 
Putah Creek (234522) – flows from Lake County.
Hunting Creek (225798) 
Cement Creek (220810)
Dyer Creek (222789)
Eticuera Creek	(223262)
Adams Creek (217966) 
Nevada Creek (229475) 
Zim Zim Creek	(238320)

Suisun Bay and Grizzly Bay 
Watercourses which feed into Suisun Bay and Grizzly Bay, listed clockwise from Benicia to Martinez:

Sulphur Springs Creek (235735)
Suisun Slough (253945)
Cordelia Slough (221556)
Green Valley Creek (224575) 
Wild Horse Creek (237756) 
Montezuma Slough (234323)
Sacramento River (1654949) – flows from Sacramento County
American River
San Joaquin River (273488) – flows from Sacramento County
For tributaries of the Sacramento and San Joaquin Rivers, see List of rivers in California.

Mount Diablo Creek (234334)
Hastings Slough (225003)
Seal Creek 
Pacheco Creek (230192)
Grayson Creek (224526)
Murderer's Creek
Walnut Creek (237199) 
Galindo Creek (224011) 
Grayson Creek (224526)
San Ramon Creek (232471) 
Las Trampas Creek (226900) 
Grizzly Creek (224628)
Lafayette Creek (226748) 
Tice Creek (236338)
Green Valley Creek (224574) 
Sycamore Creek (235918) 
Bollinger Canyon Creek (254643) 
Peyton Creek

Southern Carquinez Strait and San Pablo Bay
Watercourses which feed into the Carquinez Strait or San Pablo Bay between the Benicia-Martinez Bridge and Point San Pablo, numbered east to west:

Arroyo del Hambre (255059) 
Alhambra Creek (218119) 
Bull Valley Creek
Elkhorn Creek
Edwards Creek
Cañada del Cierbo (220523) 
Rodeo Creek (231801) 
Refugio Creek (231480) 
Ohlone Creek
Pinole Creek (230743) 
Garrity Creek (224083) 
Rheem Creek 
Karlson Creek
San Pablo Creek (232457) 
Lauterwasser Creek (226957) 
Bear Creek (218800) 
Castro Creek (220706) 
Herman Slough
Wildcat Creek (237791)

Northeastern San Francisco Bay
Watercourses which feed into the east shore of San Francisco Bay between Point San Pablo and the Bay Bridge, numbered north to south:

Meeker Slough
Baxter/Stege Creek 
Fluvius Innominatus/Central Creek 
Cerrito Creek (254734) 
Middle/Blackberry Creek
Schoolhouse Creek
Codornices Creek (254755) 
Marin/Village Creek
Strawberry Creek (235581) 
Potter Creek
Derby Creek
Temescal Creek (236092)

Eastern San Francisco Bay
Watercourses which feed into the east shore of San Francisco Bay between the Bay Bridge and the San Mateo–Hayward Bridge, numbered from north to south:

Glen Echo Creek (224215)
Indian Gulch (225879)
Sausal Creek (232602) 
Shephard Creek (232958) 
Palo Seco Creek (230277) 
Peralta Creek (230520) 
Lion Creek (227172) 
Arroyo Viejo (218410) 
Elmhurst Creek
San Leandro Creek (232428) 
Redwood Creek (231419) 
Miller Creek
Kaiser Creek (254842) 
Buckhorn Creek (220052) 
Moraga Creek
Indian Creek (225858) 
San Lorenzo Creek (232434) 
Castro Valley Creek 
Chabot Creek 
Crow Creek (233742) 
Cull Creek (221904) 
Norris Creek (229589) 
Bolinas Creek (219604) 
Palomares Creek (230280) 
Eden Canyon Creek (222968) 
Sulphur Creek (235709)  
Ward Creek (237227)

Southeastern San Francisco Bay
Watercourses which feed into the east shore of San Francisco Bay between the San Mateo–Hayward Bridge and the Dumbarton Bridge, listed north to south:

Mount Eden Creek (229145) 
North Creek (229624) 
Alameda Creek (1654946) 
Dry Creek (222606) 
Stonybrook Canyon (235553)
Arroyo de la Laguna (218389) 
Vallecitos Creek (236963) 
Sinbad Creek (233170) 
Arroyo Valle (255060) 
Arroyo Bayo (218394)
San Antonio Creek (232367)
Arroyo Mocho (218404) 
Arroyo Las Positas (218402) 
Arroyo Seco (218407) 
South San Ramon Creek (235109) 
Alamo Creek (218055) 
Coyote Creek (221729)
Sheridan Creek (234690) 
San Antonio Creek (1654950) 
Indian Creek (225864) 
Apperson Creek (218316) 
La Costa Creek
Williams Gulch (237847)
Pirates Creek (230775) 
Haynes Gulch (225064)
Welch Creek
Calaveras Creek (254688) 
Arroyo Hondo (233435) 
Isabel Creek (254822) 
Long Branch (227538) 
Bonita Creek (219639) 
Smith Creek (233323) 
Sulphur Creek

Southern San Francisco Bay
Watercourses which feed into the San Francisco Bay south of the Dumbarton Bridge, listed clockwise:

Newark Slough (229511)
Plummer Creek
Mowry Slough (229219)
Mud Slough (229250)
Laguna Creek
Agua Caliente Creek (218017)
Cañada Del Aliso (220520)
Sabercat/Sabre Cat Creek
Washington Creek
Mission Creek (228831)
Morrison Creek (229079)
Vargas Creek

Coyote Creek (255083)
Scott Creek (232723)
Line C – man-made drain, connecting creeks which historically dispersed into marsh
Toroges Creek (236468)
Agua Fria Creek (218018)
Lower Penitencia Creek
Calera Creek
Berryessa Creek
Arroyo de los Coches
Piedmont Creek
Upper Penitencia Creek
Arroyo Aguague
Lower Silver Creek
Miguelita Creek
Babb Creek (218488) 
South Babb Creek (234920) 
Thompson Creek
Upper Silver Creek
Las Animas Creek (226891)
San Felipe Creek (234625)
Guadalupe River (253220)
Alamitos Creek (218054) 
Arroyo Calero (218395) 
Guadalupe Creek (253236) 
Hicks Creek (220964)
Pheasant Creek (230590)
Canoas Creek (254700)
Los Gatos Creek (227672) 
Ross Creek (231908) 
Guadalupe Slough (224698) 
Saratoga Creek (253826) 
San Tomas Aquino Creek (232477) 
Smith Creek 
Calabazas Creek (220373) 
Prospect Creek (253793)
Regnart Creek
Stevens Creek (1667885)
Heney Creek
Gold Mine Creek
Indian Creek
Bay Creek
Gold Mine Creek
Swiss Creek
Montebello Creek
Permanente Creek (234449)
Hale Creek (224788)
Adobe Creek (217989)
Purisima Creek (253797)
Barron Creek (239012)
Matadero Creek (228215)
Arastradero Creek (218335)
Deer Creek (253877)
San Francisquito Creek (232397)
Corte Madera Creek (254779)
Sausal Creek (1654941)
Alambique Creek (218044)
Dennis Martin Creek (228169)
Bear Creek (218820)
Dry Creek
West Union Creek
Los Trancos Creek (254941)

Western San Francisco Bay
Watercourses which feed into the west shore of San Francisco Bay between the Dumbarton Bridge and the Golden Gate, listed south to north:

Redwood Creek (255118) 
Arroyo Ojo de Agua (238759) 
Cordilleras Creek (221557) 
Pulgas Creek (234518) 
Belmont Creek (254600) 
Laurel Creek (226937) 
Borel Creek
Beresford Creek
Leslie Creek
San Mateo Creek (1655002) 
San Andreas Creek
Laguna Creek
Polhemus Creek (230901) 
Poplar Creek
Burlingame Creek
Upper Terrace Creek
Ralston Creek
Cherry Canyon Creek
Sanchez Creek (232485) 
Lower Terrace Creek
Easton Creek (233826) 
Mills Creek (234308) 
Millbrae Creek
Green Hills Creek
San Bruno Creek (234623) 
El Zanjon
Colma Creek (221398) 
Twelvemile Creek
Guadalupe Valley Creek (224700)
Visitation Valley Creek
Yosemite Creek
Islais Creek (254827)
Precita Creek
Mission Creek
Hayes Creek
Arroyo Dolores
El Polin Creek (Tennessee Valley)
Dragonfly Creek

Pacific Coast south of the Golden Gate

San Francisco Coast
Watercourses which feed into the Pacific Ocean between the Golden Gate and Thornton Beach, from north to south:

Lobos Creek (227449)

Northern San Mateo Coast
Watercourses which feed into the Pacific Ocean between Thornton Beach and Miramontes Point, numbered north to south:

Milagra Creek 
Calera Creek 
Rockaway Creek 
San Pedro Creek (234639) 
North Fork (234373) 
Middle Fork (234291)
South Fork (235049)
San Vicente Creek (234642) 
Denniston Creek (233779) 
Arroyo de en Medio (233428) 
Naples Creek 
Frenchmans Creek (233909) 
Locks Creek (234179) 
Pilarcitos Creek (253889) 
Arroyo León (233436) 
Mills Creek (228769) 
Madonna Creek (227924) 
Apanolio Creek (233421) 
Corinda Los Trancos Creek (233718) 
Nuff Creek (234390) 
North Branch
South Branch

Central San Mateo Coast
Watercourses which feed into the Pacific Ocean between Miramontes Point and Pigeon Point, numbered north to south:

Cañada Verde Creek (1786133) 
Purisima Creek (253798) 
Whittemore Gulch (237717)
Walker Gulch (237174)
Grabtown Gulch (224371)
Soda Gulch (234832)
Lobitos Creek (254929) 
Schoolhouse Creek (232672) 
Rogers Gulch (231823)
Tunitas Creek (236624) 
Dry Creek (222617) 
East Fork (222904) 
Rings Gulch (234568) 
Mitchell Creek (228864) 
San Gregorio Creek (232403) 
Coyote Creek (221728) 
Clear Creek (221185) 
El Corte de Madera Creek
Bogess Creek (219583) 
Kingston Creek (226613) 
Harrington Creek (224956) 
Alpine Creek (254555) 
Mindego Creek (228782) 
La Honda Creek (226707) 
Woodruff Creek (238152) 
Weeks Creek (237398) 
Spanish Ranch Creek (235161)
Pomponio Creek (230913) 
Long Gulch (227559)
Dairy Gulch (221978)
Pescadero Creek (234452) – flows from Santa Cruz County 
Butano Creek (220266) 
Little Butano Creek (227209) 
South Fork (234979) 
Bradley Creek (219762) 
Chandler Gulch (220906)
Honsinger Creek (225527) 
Windmill Gulch (238011)
Big Chicken Hollow (219158)
Little Chicken Hollow (227221)
Newell Gulch (229514)
Roy Gulch (231988)
Bloomquist Creek (219470) 
Peterson Creek (230568)
McCormick Creek (228321) 
Hoffman Creek (225382) 
Jones Gulch (226336)
Harwood Creek (224997) 
Dark Gulch (222021)
Carriger Creek (220638)
Keyston Creek (226557) 
Tarwater Creek (236033) 
Rhododendron Creek (231522) 
Peters Creek (230562)
Evans Creek (223287) 
Bear Creek (218799) 
Lambert Creek (226834) 
Fall Creek (223364) 
Slate Creek (233236) 
Oil Creek (229945) 
Little Boulder Creek (227199) – flows from Santa Cruz County 
Waterman Creek (237336) 
Arroyo de los Frijoles (218391) 
Spring Bridge Gulch (235229)
Yankee Jim Gulch (238228)

Southern San Mateo Coast
Watercourses which feed into the Pacific Ocean south of Pigeon Point, numbered north to south:

Gazos Creek (224105) – flows from Santa Cruz County. 
Old Womans Creek (229991) – flows from Santa Cruz County. 
Old Womans Creek (1701701) 
Whitehouse Creek (237690) – flows from Santa Cruz County. 
Cascade Creek (220660) – flows from Santa Cruz County. 
Green Oaks Creek (224554) – flows from Santa Cruz County. 
Año Nuevo Creek (254567) – flows from Santa Cruz County. 
Cold Dip Creek (252424) – flows from Santa Cruz County. 
Finney Creek (223512) – flows from Santa Cruz County. 
Elliot Creek (223153) – flows from Santa Cruz County.

See also

Hydrography of the San Francisco Bay Area
List of lakes in the San Francisco Bay Area
List of rivers of California

References

External links
 Guide to San Francisco Bay Area Creeks

 
Water
Watercourses